This is a list of hospitals in Brazil.  There are  105 hospitals in Brazil, accounting for a total of 480,332 hospital beds.  66 percent of the hospitals are private and the remaining 34% are public, being either Federal, State or Municipal hospitals.

 Hospital das Clínicas da Universidade de São Paulo, São Paulo
 Hospital de Clínicas de Porto Alegre, Porto Alegre
 Hospital Daher, Lago Sul
 Hospital São Paulo, São Paulo
 Hospital Sírio-Libanês, São Paulo
 Hospital Israelita Albert Einstein, São Paulo
 Hospital do Servidor Público Estadual, São Paulo
 Santa Casa de Misericordia Hospital, Porto Alegre
Hospital Vitória, Rio de Janeiro
Hospital Samaritano, Rio de Janeiro
Hospital Barra D´or, Rio de Janeiro
Hospital Unimed, Rio de Janeiro
Hospital Rio Mar, Rio de Janeiro
Hospital São Luiz, São Paulo
 Clínica SEUMED, Maringá
Hospital Nove de Julho, São Paulo
Santa Catarina Hospital, São Paulo

See also

List of hospital ships of the Brazilian Navy

References

 Ministry of Health, Ministry of Health; Statistics on the Brazilian healthcare sector.  Retrieved 02/01/14.
 Ministry of Health, Ministry of Health; Registry of healthcare facilities and their installations.  Retrieved 02/01/14.
 Global Health Intelligence, Information on Healthcare in emerging markets.  Retrieved 02/01/14.

Hospitals
 List
Hospitals
Brazil
Brazil